Robert Jobson is a British journalist, author and broadcaster (Born 23 March 1964). He co-authored the 2002 book Diana: Closely Guarded Secret with Princess Diana's Scotland Yard personal protection officer Inspector Ken Wharfe. He and Wharfe also wrote Guarding Diana (2017). Jobson co-wrote Bulletproof, the life story of Royal Marines Commando and George Cross recipient Matthew Croucher GC.

Jobson has written several other books on the British royal family, including Charles at Seventy: Thoughts, Hopes and Dreams, The Royal Family Operations Manual, Prince Philip's Century 1921-2021: The Extraordinary Life of the Duke of Edinburgh.

Jobson was called "The Godfather of Royal Reporting" by The Wall Street Journal in an article on 9 April 2011 by correspondent Jeanne Whelan. He has reported on the British royal family since 1991 as royal correspondent for British newspapers including The Sun, News of the World, Daily Express and from 2011 the Evening Standard.

He was the recipient of the London Press Club Scoop of the Year award in 2005 for his world exclusive about the engagement of Prince Charles and Camilla Parker Bowles.

Jobson is Royal Editor for the Australian breakfast show Sunrise on Channel 7 as well as royal contributor for Good Morning America on US network ABC. He was "Royal Consultant" for Mark Schwahn's originally scripted series The Royals for E! starring British actresses Elizabeth Hurley and Dame Joan Collins and played cameo roles as himself in series 1, 2, 3 and 4.

Bibliography 
 Robert Jobson, The Future Royal Family: William, Kate and the modern royals. John Blake, London, 25 June 2014. ISBN 9781784186760. 
 Robert Jobson, Prince Philip's Century 1921-2021:The Extraordinary Life of the Duke of Edinburgh  Ad Lib Publishers, 15 April 2021. ISBN 9781913543099
 Robert Jobson, Charles at Seventy: Thoughts, Hopes and Dreams John Blake, London, 1 November 2018. ISBN 9781786068873 
 Robert Jobson, William at 40: The Making of a Modern Monarch Ad Lib Publishers, 9 June 2022. ISBN 9781913543082
 Robert Jobson and Ken Wharfe,  Diana: Closely Guarded Secret John Blake, London, 17 August 2016. ISBN 9781786061133
 Robert Jobson and Ken Wharfe, Guarding Diana: Protecting the Princess Around the World John Blake, London. 10 August 2017. ISBN 9781786063885
 Robert Jobson, The Royal Family Operations Manual , Haynes Publishing. 1 April 2020. ISBN 9781785216657
 Matt Croucher GC and Robert Jobson, Bulletproof , Arrow , 10 June 2010. ISBN 9780099543084

References

External links 

 

1964 births
Living people
Alumni of the University of Kent
British biographers
British male journalists
Male biographers
Royal correspondents